Chuqi Patilla (Aymara chuqi gold, patilla step, "gold step", Hispanicized spelling Choquepatilla) is a mountain in the Andes of southern Peru, about  high. It is situated in the Puno Region, Chucuito Province, in the west of the Pisacoma District. Chuqi Patilla lies east of Qarwa P'iq'iña.

References

Mountains of Puno Region
Mountains of Peru